Kharab-e Mian Rud (also Romanized as Kharāb-e Mīān Rūd; also known as Kharābeh-ye Mīān Rūd) is a village in Harazpey-ye Jonubi Rural District, in the Central District of Amol County, Mazandaran Province, Iran. At the 2006 census, its population was 133, in 37 families.

References 

Populated places in Amol County